Leptocircini is a tribe of swallowtail butterflies that includes the genera Eurytides (kite swallowtails), Graphium (swordtails), and Lamproptera (dragontails).

Taxonomy
The tribe consists of roughly 140 species in nine genera worldwide and one native North American species, Protographium marcellus.

Genera
This tribe consists of the following genera:

 Eurytides
 Graphium
 Iphiclides
 Lamproptera
 Meandrusa
 Mimoides
 Protesilaus
 Protographium
 Teinopalpus

References

 Scott, J. A. (1992). Butterflies of North America: A Natural History and Field Guide. Stanford, Calif.: Stanford University Press. 
 Tyler, H. A., Brown, K. S., Jr., & Wilson, K. H. (1994). Swallowtail Butterflies of the Americas: A Study in Biological Dynamics, Ecological Diversity, Biosystematics, and Conservation. Gainesville, Florida: Scientific Publishers. 
 Lepidoptera and some other life forms, Protographium
 Lepidoptera and some other life forms, Lamproptera

Papilionidae
Butterfly tribes